Hossein Shayan (born 30 March 1971) is an Iranian athlete. He competed in the men's high jump at the 1992 Summer Olympics.

References

1971 births
Living people
Athletes (track and field) at the 1992 Summer Olympics
Iranian male high jumpers
Olympic athletes of Iran
Place of birth missing (living people)
Athletes (track and field) at the 1990 Asian Games
Athletes (track and field) at the 1994 Asian Games
Asian Games competitors for Iran